Felix Roth (born 13 November 1987) is a German former professional footballer who played as an attacking midfielder. He retired at the end of the 2020–21 season.

References

External links
 

1987 births
Living people
People from Offenburg
Sportspeople from Freiburg (region)
German footballers
Footballers from Baden-Württemberg
Association football midfielders
2. Bundesliga players
Austrian Football Bundesliga players
2. Liga (Austria) players
Offenburger FV players
SC Freiburg players
SC Austria Lustenau players
SC Rheindorf Altach players
German expatriate footballers
German expatriate sportspeople in Austria
Expatriate footballers in Austria